Martí Joan de Galba (died 1490) was once considered to be the co-author of the famous Valencian epic Tirant lo Blanch, which he worked on after the death of his friend, Joanot Martorell.

David H. Rosenthal, one of the two translators of the work into English, notes a consistency in the portions attributed to Galba; especially place-names and his familiarity with John Mandeville's Travels. However, the philologist, Joan Coromines, suggests that Galba's role was limited to copy editing; such as dividing the book into chapters.

Joan Roís de Corella has been cited as a more likely source for any substantive additions to the text.

References
Martí Joan de Galba; enciclopèdia.cat

External links 
 

1490 deaths
Medieval Catalan-language writers
15th-century Spanish writers
Year of birth unknown
15th-century people from the Kingdom of Aragon